The Mayor of Whangarei is the directly elected head of the Whangarei District Council, the local government authority for the Whangarei District in New Zealand, which it controls as a territorial authority. The position has existed since 27 October 1896, when the Whangarei Borough Council was constituted. Later the mayor presided over Whangarei City Council. The position has existed in its present form since 1 November 1989, following the amalgamation of Whangarei County Council, Whangarei City Council and Hikurangi Town Board. The mayor is supported by a deputy mayor.

The mayor has significant executive powers, their own staff and the ability to appoint the chairpersons of the council's committees.

List of mayors
The following table is a complete list of the mayors of Whangarei since the formation of Whangarei Borough in 1896.

Deputy mayor
The deputy mayor is the second highest elected official in the Whangarei District Council. The deputy mayor acts in support of the Mayor of Whangarei. It is the second highest elected position in the council. However, like the position of Deputy Prime Minister, this seniority does not necessarily translate into power. They are appointed by the mayor from the elected ward councillors. The current deputy mayor is Greg Innes, who currently represents the Whangarei Heads Ward ward on the Whangarei District Council. Innes was announced as deputy mayor in October 2019, and assumed office upon the swearing in of the new council.

Beyond committees of the whole council, the deputy mayor is an ex-officio member of the following Whangarei District Council committees:
 Community Development Committee
 Finance and Corporate Committee
 Infrastructure Committee
 Planning and Development Committee

The deputy mayor may be appointed to additional committees that the mayor wishes to appoint them to. The following table lists the deputy mayors since the local government reforms of 1989.

References

Whangarei
People from Whangārei
 Whangarei